Mount Binga may refer to:
 Mount Binga, Queensland, a locality in the Toowoomba Region, Australia
 Monte Binga, a mountain on the border of Zimbabwe and Mozambique in Africa